Seppo Parkkila M.D., Ph.D. (born 1966) is a professor of anatomy at the University of Tampere, Finland. He graduated from the University of Oulu in 1991 (M.D.) and obtained his PhD-degree from the same university in 1994. In 1996-1998 he worked as a visiting researcher at Saint Louis University. In 2002 he moved to the University of Tampere where he started to work as a professor of medical technology and biotechnology and later in 2008 he was appointed to the post of professor in anatomy. His research work has been focused on pH-regulation, carbonic anhydrases and regulation of iron homeostasis.

References

External links
 Research group home page and publications

Finnish anatomists
Living people
1966 births